This is the discography of American R&B and soul singer-songwriter Blu Cantrell.

In 2001, her debut album, So Blu, was released. The record saw major success when it peaked at number eight on the Billboard 200 chart, eventually going gold in the United States. The album's hit single "Hit 'Em Up Style (Oops!)", which peaked at number two on the US Billboard Hot 100, became the number one most added record to radio in the country, breaking Elvis Presley's record for most played on all genres of radio. The song earned Cantrell Grammy Award nominations for Best Female R&B Vocal Performance and for Best R&B Song, as well as an American Music Award nomination for Favorite Soul/R&B New Artist, both in 2002.

In 2003, Cantrell released her second album, Bittersweet, which peaked at number 37 on the Billboard 200. The success of 'Bittersweet' was much greater worldwide than in the U.S. due to the number one single 'Breathe' which climbed to the top of the charts. The song became number one without the support of any major radio syndication and eventually was added to major rotation after it had already become independently worldwide. The record earned Cantrell a Grammy Award nomination for Best R&B Album and entered the Billboard Top R&B/Hip-Hop Albums chart at number eight. The album produced two hit singles, these being "Breathe" and "Make Me Wanna Scream", the former being a collaboration with Sean Paul. "Breathe" peaked at number one for four weeks in the United Kingdom and broke Madonna's song "Lucky Star" single for most played on radio. It eventually became one of the most successful singles of the year in Europe, Australia, South Africa, and several other countries worldwide.

Albums

Studio albums

Compilation albums

Mixtapes

Singles

As lead artist

As featured artist

Soundtrack appearances

Guest appearances

Notes

 A  From L.A. to L.O. was released in 2004 exclusively in the UK and Japan after the success of 2003's Bittersweet. Although its North American release was cancelled, the collection was heavily circulated on the internet and was mistaken as a full follow-up album to Bittersweet.

References

Discographies of American artists